A lake ball (also known as a surf ball, beach ball or spill ball) is a ball of debris found on ocean beaches and lakes large enough to have wave action.  The rolling motion of the waves gathers debris in the water and eventually will form the materials into a ball.  The materials vary from year to year and from location to location depending on the debris the motion gathers.

The earliest known reference to lake balls is Walden:

Larch balls 

A specific type of lake ball, a larch ball is a structure created when Western Larch needles floating in a lake become entangled in a spherical shape due to the action of waves. They are most commonly known to form in Seeley Lake, Montana; however, they have also been known to form in similar regions such as Clark Fork and lakes in Tracy, New Brunswick such as Peltoma Lake, Big Kedron Lake, and Little Kedron Lake. Typical specimens are 3 to 4 inches (8 to 10 centimeters) in diameter. More rarely, larger ones are found.

References 

Hydrology
Habitat